The 2020 Auckland Open (sponsored by ASB Bank) was a joint ATP and WTA tennis tournament, played on outdoor hard courts. It was the 35th edition of the women's event, and the 44th edition of the men's event. It took place at the ASB Tennis Centre in Auckland, New Zealand, from 6 to 12 January 2020 for the women, and from 13 to 18 January 2020 for the men.

Points and prize money

Point distribution

Prize money 

1 Qualifiers' prize money is also the Round of 32 prize money
* per team

ATP singles main-draw entrants

Seeds 

1 Rankings as of 6 January 2020.

Other entrants 
The following players received wildcards into the singles main draw:
  Alejandro Davidovich Fokina
  Jannik Sinner
  Michael Venus

The following players received entry from the qualifying draw:
  Michael Mmoh
  Thiago Monteiro
  Vasek Pospisil
  Mikael Ymer

The following player received entry as a lucky loser:
  Leonardo Mayer

Withdrawals
  Radu Albot → replaced by  Leonardo Mayer
  Daniil Medvedev → replaced by  Tennys Sandgren

ATP doubles main-draw entrants

Seeds 

1 Rankings as of 6 January 2020.

Other entrants 
The following pairs received wildcards into the doubles main draw:
  Mackenzie McDonald /  Ajeet Rai 
  Cameron Norrie /  Rhett Purcell

WTA singles main-draw entrants

Seeds 

1 Rankings as of December 30, 2019

Other entrants 
The following players received wildcards into the singles main draw:
  Eugenie Bouchard
  Paige Hourigan
  Valentina Ivanov

The following player received entry using a protected ranking into the singles main draw:
  Catherine Bellis

The following players received entry from the qualifying draw:
  Camila Giorgi
  Varvara Lepchenko
  Ann Li
  Greet Minnen

The following players received entry as lucky losers:
  Usue Maitane Arconada
  Ysaline Bonaventure
  Caty McNally

Withdrawals
  Bianca Andreescu → replaced by  Christina McHale
  Svetlana Kuznetsova → replaced by  Usue Maitane Arconada
  Jeļena Ostapenko → replaced by  Ysaline Bonaventure
  Monica Puig → replaced by  Jessica Pegula
  Alison Van Uytvanck → replaced by  Caty McNally

Retirements
  Alizé Cornet (right adductor strain)

WTA doubles main-draw entrants

Seeds 

1 Rankings as of December 30, 2019

Other entrants 
The following pairs received wildcards into the doubles main draw:
  Sara Errani /  Paige Hourigan
  Allie Kiick /  Erin Routliffe

Retirements 
  Laura Siegemund (right thigh injury)

Champions

Men's singles 

  Ugo Humbert def.  Benoît Paire, 7–6(7–2), 3–6, 7–6(7–5)

Women's singles 

  Serena Williams def.  Jessica Pegula, 6–3, 6–4

Men's doubles 

  Luke Bambridge /  Ben McLachlan def.  Marcus Daniell /  Philipp Oswald, 7–6(7–2), 6–3

Women's doubles 

  Asia Muhammad /  Taylor Townsend def.  Serena Williams /  Caroline Wozniacki, 6–4, 6–4

References

External links 
Official website - Men's tournament

2020 ATP Tour
2020 WTA Tour
2020
2020
2020 in New Zealand women's sport
January 2020 sports events in New Zealand
Auck